Francis Williams (–1770) was a scholar and poet born in Kingston, Jamaica, who travelled to Europe and became a citizen of Britain. In the 1720s, he returned to Jamaica, where he set up a free school for the children of Free black people in Jamaica.

Early life and family

Francis Williams was born around 1700 to John and Dorothy Williams, a free black couple in the Colony of Jamaica. John Williams had been freed in 1699 by the will of his former master. 

The Williams family's status as free, property-owning black people set them apart from other Jamaican inhabitants, who were at the time mostly British colonists and enslaved Africans. Eventually, the Williams family property expanded to include both land and slaves. Though it was rare for black people in the 18th century to receive an education, Francis Williams and his siblings were able to afford schooling due to their father's wealth. Francis travelled to Europe, where he was reported to be in 1721.

In England

Francis was also made a naturalized citizen of Britain, a status unavailable to enslaved people. He took the oath of citizenship in 1723.

Some, like Edward Long, reported that Francis Williams was the beneficiary of a social experiment devised by John Montagu, 2nd Duke of Montagu to determine whether adequate education could lead Williams to match the intellectual achievements of his white contemporaries. This story holds that the Duke paid for Williams to attend an English grammar school and then continue at the University of Cambridge, a narrative likely originating from Montagu's relationships with Job Ben Solomon and Ignatius Sancho. However, Cambridge has no record of Williams' attendance; furthermore the Williams family's wealth could have easily supported his overseas education without the Duke's sponsorship.

In Jamaica

In the 1720s, Williams returned to Jamaica, where he set up a free school for black children. In 18th-century Jamaica, most free schools were only open to the children of poor white inhabitants. Wealthy planters had bequeathed property and funds to establish foundations to educate poor white children and coloureds who could be classified as white. In his school, Williams taught reading, writing, Latin and mathematics.

Supporters of slavery, such as Long, tried to downplay the educational accomplishments of Williams. Long's History of Jamaica contains a note about the possible attribution of "Welcome, Brother Debtor", a folk tune that gained popularity in Britain during the 18th century, to Williams or to Wetenhall Wilkes. 

However, Williams encountered discrimination on his return to Jamaica. In 1724, a white planter named William Brodrick insulted Williams, calling him a "black dog", whereupon Williams reacted by calling Brodrick a "white dog" several times. Brodrick punched Williams, as a result of which his "mouth was bloody", but Williams retaliated, after which Brodrick's "shirt and neckcloth had been tore (sic) by the said Williams". Williams insisted that since he was a free black man, he could not be tried for assault, as would have been the case with black slaves who hit a white man, because he was defending himself.

The Assembly, which comprised elected white planters, was alarmed at the success with which Williams argued his case, and how he secured the dismissal of Brodrick's attempts to prosecute him. Complaining that "Williams's behaviour is of great encouragement to the negroes of the island in general", the Assembly then decided to "bring in a bill to reduce the said Francis Williams to the state of other free negroes in this island". This legislation made it illegal for any black person in Jamaica to strike a white person, even in self-defence.

Poetry

"An Ode to George Haldane" (excerpt)
Rash councils now, with each malignant plan,
Each faction, in that evil hour began,
At your approach are in confusion fled,
Nor while you rule, shall raise their dastard head.
Alike the master and the slave shall see
Their neck , the yoke unbound by thee.

"Welcome, welcome Brother Debtor" (excerpt)
What was is made great Alexander
Weep at his unfriendly fate
twas because he cou'd not Wander
beyond the World's strong Prison Gate
For the World is also bounded
by the heavens and Stars above
Why should We then be confounded
Since there's nothing free but Jove.

See also

 Black British elite, Williams' class in Britain
 Ignatius Sancho, another protégé of the Montagu family
 Phillis Wheatley, another early Black poet writing in English contemporaneously

References

External links

 Williams, Francis. "Carmen, or, An Ode", in Thomas W. Krise, Caribbeana: An Anthology of English Literature, 1657-1777, The University of Chicago Press, 1999, pp. 315–317. 
 Mathematicians of the African Diaspora, State University of New York at Buffalo.
 

1702 births
1770 deaths
People from Kingston, Jamaica
Black British writers
18th-century Jamaican people
18th-century Jamaican poets
Free people of color